Xalxal may refer to:
Xalxal, Nakhchivan, Azerbaijan
Xalxal, Oghuz, Azerbaijan

See also
 Khalkhal (disambiguation)